David Paradelo (born 7 October 1985) is a Canadian water polo coach. He was the head coach of the Canada women's national water polo team at the 2020 Summer Olympics.

References

External links
 

1985 births
Living people
Canadian male water polo players
Canadian water polo coaches
Canada women's national water polo team coaches
Water polo coaches at the 2020 Summer Olympics